Kranochori (before 1928: Δρανίτσι - Dranitsi) is a village in Kastoria Regional Unit, Macedonia, Greece.

The Greek census (1920) recorded 289 people in the village and in 1923 there were 25 inhabitants (or 4 families) who were Muslim. Following the Greek-Turkish population exchange, in 1926 within Dranitsi there were 6 refugee families from Pontus. The Greek census (1928) recorded 305 village inhabitants. There were 6 refugee families (17 people) in 1928.

References

Populated places in Kastoria (regional unit)